Lucjan Józefowicz (born 30 June 1935) is a former Polish cyclist. He competed in the individual pursuit at the 1964 Summer Olympics.

References

1935 births
Living people
Polish male cyclists
Olympic cyclists of Poland
Cyclists at the 1964 Summer Olympics
People from Poddębice County
Sportspeople from Łódź Voivodeship
20th-century Polish people